This is a list of earthquakes in 1927. Only magnitude 6.0 or greater earthquakes appear on this list. Lower magnitude events are included if they have caused death, injury, or damage. Events which occurred in remote areas will be excluded from the list as they wouldn't have generated significant media interest. All dates are listed according to UTC time. China and Japan both saw great destruction caused by earthquakes in March and May. The China earthquake in particular had nearly 41,000 deaths. Yunnan Province, China had its fair share of earthquakes. Ukraine had several earthquakes with one on September 11 causing deaths. The West Bank region had a destructive tremor in July.

Overall

By death toll 

 Note: At least 10 casualties

By magnitude 

 Note: At least 7.0 magnitude

Notable events

January

February

March

April

May

June

July

August

September

October

November

December

References

1927
 
1927